Witness Protection is the sixth studio album by American singer Dave Hollister. It released by GospoCentric Records and the Zomba Label Group on August 5, 2008 in the United States.

Critical reception

Allmusic editor Andree Farias wrote that on Witness Protection "Hollister doesn't skimp on slickness because he's found God; on the contrary, the album offers some of the most true to form R&B confections gospel has seen in 2008. Hollister keeps things unabashedly grown and sexy here: his loverman tendencies haven't gone anywhere, with a mature vibe that recalls former colleagues Ginuwine, Avant, and Jaheim."

Track listing

Charts

References

2008 albums
Dave Hollister albums